The Sanremo Music Festival 2016 (66° Festival della Canzone Italiana di Sanremo 2016) was the 66th annual Sanremo Music Festival, a television song contest held at the Teatro Ariston in Sanremo, Liguria, Italy  between 9 and 13 February 2016 and organised and broadcast by Radiotelevisione italiana (RAI). The show was presented by Carlo Conti, who also served as the artistic director for the competition. Conti hosted the show together with Virginia Raffaele, Mădălina Diana Ghenea and Gabriel Garko. The program was written by Carlo Conti, Ivana Sabatini, Emanuele Giovannini, Leopoldo Siano, Giona Peduzzi, Riccardo Cassini, Martino Clericetti and Mario D'Amico.

The Campioni or Big Artists section included 20 established Italian artists, competing with a song each, while 8 artists and songs competed in the Nuove Proposte or Newcomers'  section. The final for the Newcomers'  section took place on 12 February 2016 where "Amen" performed by Francesco Gabbani was selected as the winner. The final for the Big Artists section took place on 13 February 2016 where "Un giorno mi dirai" performed by Stadio was selected as the winner.

The winner of the Big Artists section also won the right to represent Italy at the Eurovision Song Contest 2016. RAI confirmed after the competition that Stadio decided not to participate in the contest. Runner-up Francesca Michielin was selected by RAI as Italy's Eurovision entrant.

Format
The 2016 edition of the Sanremo Music Festival took place at the Teatro Ariston in Sanremo, organised by the Italian broadcaster Radiotelevisione italiana (RAI). The artistic director for the competition was Carlo Conti, who was appointed to the position for a second consecutive year. The competition took place over five evenings between 9–13 February 2016. The selected artists competed during the festival under two different sections: Campioni/Big Artists and Nuove Proposte/Newcomers' . Twenty songs competed in the Big Artists section and eight songs competed in the Newcomers'  section; both competitive sections ran concurrently with each other over the five evenings. All songs in the competition were required to be new compositions performed in the Italian language with some exceptions for words and phrases in other dialects/languages. The songs were performed in the competition live and accompanied by an orchestra.

The twenty entries competing in the Big Artists section were presented during the first and second evenings on 9 and 10 February. Ten songs were performed during each evening and were voted upon by a press jury (50%) and public televote (50%) with no eliminations occurring during either evening. All twenty songs advanced to the fourth evening, the semi-final, and faced an additional vote consisting of public televoting (40%), an expert jury (30%) and an demoscopic poll (30%). The weighted average of the votes from the first and second evenings as well as the votes from the fourth evening produced a total ranking of all of the songs. Based on this ranking, the top fifteen entries qualified to the final on the fifth evening on 13 February. The bottom five entries from the fourth evening entered a repechage round and faced an additional public televote to determine the one entry that would be readmitted to compete in the final; the other four entries were eliminated. In the final, sixteen songs competed and the top three advanced to a second round of voting in order to select the winner. The results of both rounds of voting were determined by public televoting (40%), an expert jury (30%) and an demoscopic poll (30%). An additional competition among the performers competing in the Big Artists section occurred during the third evening where each act performed a cover of an Italian song or an international hit translated into Italian. The best cover, as determined by the equal combination of votes from a press jury and a public televote, was awarded with a prize.

The eight entries competing in the Newcomers'  section were divided into four semi-final duels consisting of two songs each. Two duels took place during both the second and third evenings on 10 and 11 February. The winner of each duel, as determined by the equal combination of votes from a press jury and a public televote, advanced to the final held during the fourth evening on 12 February. During the final, the four entries competed and the winner was determined via the combination of a public televote (40%), an expert jury (30%) and an demoscopic poll (30%).

Voting
Voting during the five evenings occurred through different combinations of the following methods:
Public televoting – carried out via landline, mobile phone, app and/or online voting.
Press jury – composed of accredited journalists that followed the competition from the Roof Hall at the Teatro Ariston.
Demoscopic poll – composed of a sample of 300 music fans, which voted from their homes via an electronic voting system managed by Ipsos.
Expert jury – eight personalities from the world of music, entertainment and culture consisting of:
Franz Di Cioccio (Chairman) – Musician, actor and journalist
Laura Valente – Singer and musician
Fausto Brizzi – Screenwriter, producer and film director
Nicoletta Mantovani – Commissioner for cooperation and international relations for Florence; widow of opera singer Luciano Pavarotti
Massimiliano Pani – Songwriter, producer and composer
Valentina Correani – Television presenter and actress
Paola Maugeri – Journalist, singer and television presenter 
Federico l'Olandese Volante –  Radio presenter, record producer and television personality

Presenters
Television presenter Carlo Conti, who was also the competition's artistic director, hosted Sanremo for a second consecutive year. Conti was joined by three additional hosts: actress and comic Virginia Raffaele, Romanian actress and model Mădălina Diana Ghenea and actor Gabriel Garko. Raffaele presented the first four evenings of the competition impersonating different female celebrities: actress Sabrina Ferilli (first evening), ballet dancer and actress Carla Fracci (second evening), fashion designer Donatella Versace (third evening) and actress, model and previous Sanremo host Belén Rodríguez (fourth evening).

Selections
Decisions related to the selection of artists and compositions were taken by Carlo Conti in collaboration with a music committee under the direction of Rai 1. The members of the music committee consisted of Piero Chiambretti (presenter/showman), Rosita Celentano (presenter/singer/actress), Giovanni Allevi (musician), Federico Russo (presenter), Carolina Di Domenico (VJ) and Andrea Delogu (presenter).

Newcomers' section 
Artists that were interested in competing in the Newcomers'  section could apply to one of two different qualifiers: #SG – Sanremo Giovani and Area Sanremo. The eight artists competing in the Newcomers'  section were revealed on 27 November 2015. Six of the eight artists were selected through the programme #SG – Sanremo Giovani, which aired on Rai 1 and was hosted by Carlo Conti. 655 applications were initially received from which twelve artists were selected to proceed to the televised programme. The six artists were selected by the festival's artistic director Carlo Conti together with the competition's music committee. 

Two of the eight artists, Mahmood and Miele, were selected though the competition Area Sanremo, which was a separate qualifier for the Newcomers''' section that included artists auditioning in October 2015 and being shortlisted to eight finalists before two were selected to proceed to Sanremo 2016.

 Big Artists section 
Artists competing in the Big Artists section were selected based on criteria such as the quality and originality of the songs, interpretation, contemporaneity and the fame and recognized value of the performer(s). Artists interested in competing in the Big Artists section were required to submit their proposals to RAI by 11 December 2015. The names of the twenty participants competing in the Big Artists section were announced by Carlo Conti on 13 December 2015 during the Rai 1 programme L'Arena, hosted by Massimo Giletti.

 Competing entries 

Shows

First evening
The first evening on 9 February featured ten of the twenty acts competing in the Big Artists section presenting their songs. The bottom four entries at risk of elimination were revealed in alphabetical order. In addition to the performances of the competing entries, guest performers included Laura Pausini, Elton John and Maître Gims. Other guests for the show included the comedy trio Aldo, Giovanni and Giacomo, athlete Giuseppe Ottaviani and actresses Kasia Smutniak and Anna Foglietta.

All results during the first evening were determined by the combination of public voting (50%) and the votes from the press jury (50%). While none of the entries competing in the Big Artists section were eliminated during this evening, the results were part of an overall ranking compiled from the scores each entry receives during the first and second evenings and accounted for 50% of the results during the fourth evening.Big ArtistsSecond evening
The second evening on 10 February featured the song presentations of the remaining ten acts competing in the Big Artists section. The bottom four entries at risk of elimination were revealed in alphabetical order. The first two semi-final duels for the artists competing in the Newcomers'  section also took place where the two winners of the duels proceeded to the final on the fourth evening. In addition to the performances of the competing entries, guest performers included Eros Ramazzotti, Ezio Bosso, Ellie Goulding and Salut Salon. Other guests for the show included actress Nicole Kidman, actor and comedian Nino Frassica and chef Antonino Cannavacciuolo.

All results during the second evening were determined by the combination of public voting (50%) and votes from the press jury (50%). While none of the entries competing in the Big Artists section were eliminated during this evening, the results were part of an overall ranking compiled from the scores each entry receives during the first and second evenings and accounted for 50% of the results during the fourth evening.Big ArtistsNewcomers' – Semi-final

Third evening
The third evening on 11 February featured the twenty acts competing in the Big Artists section performing cover versions of either Italian songs or international hit songs that have been translated into Italian. The competing acts had an option to perform their cover together with a guest artist. The winning cover version was determined over two rounds of voting. In the first round, the covers initially competed in five groups consisting of four entries each. The winning cover of each group qualified to the second round where the winner of the best cover prize was determined. The winner was Stadio who performed a cover of the song "La sera dei miracoli" originally performed by Lucio Dalla. The last two semi-final duels for the artists competing in the Newcomers'  section also took place where the two winners of the duels proceeded to the final on the fourth evening. In addition to the performances of the competing entries, guest performers included Pooh and Hozier. Other guests for the show included author and director Marc Hollogne, athlete Nicole Orlando and comedians Michele and Stefano Manca.

All results during the third evening were determined by the combination of public voting (50%) and votes from the press jury (50%). During the first Newcomers'  semi-final duel, "Mentre ti parlo", performed by Miele, was originally announced as the winner with 53% of the votes. However, later in the evening Carlo Conti announced that there was a mistake in the press jury vote and a re-vote resulted in the victory of "Amen" performed by Francesco Gabbani with 50.8% of the votes. Miele performed her song again in the fourth evening as a consolation prize.Big Artists – Cover Competition – First RoundBig Artists – Cover Competition – Second RoundNewcomers' – Semi-final

Fourth evening
The fourth evening on 12 February featured performances of all twenty entries by the acts competing in the Big Artists section. The top fifteen entries advanced to the fifth evening, while the bottom five competed in a repechage round to determine one more qualifier; four of the entries were ultimately eliminated from the competition. The final of the Newcomers'  section also took place during this evening where the four semi-final duel winners competed to determine the overall winner of the Newcomers'  section. "Amen" performed by Francesco Gabbani was the winner. In addition to the performances of the competing entries, guest performers included Elisa, J Balvin and Lost Frequencies. Other guests for the show include actors Enrico Brignano, Alessandro Gassmann and Rocco Papaleo. One of the eliminated entries from the Newcomers'  section, "Mentre ti parlo" by Miele, was performed again as a consolation prize after the entry was mistakenly announced as a finalist due to a voting error in the third evening.

All results for the Newcomers'  section and a portion of the results for the Big Artists section during this evening were determined by the combination of public televoting (40%), the votes of the expert jury (30%) and the votes of the demoscopic poll (30%). In the Big Artists section, to determine the top fifteen, the weighted average of the votes from the first and second evenings as well as the votes from the fourth evening were combined to produce an overall ranking. The results of the repechage round were determined solely by a public vote that commenced during the fourth evening and concluded the following day with the result announced during the fifth evening.Big Artists – Semi-finalNewcomers' – Final

Fifth evening
The fifth evening on 13 February concluded the competition by determining the winner of the Big Artists section. Sixteen entries competed: the fifteen entries that qualified from the fourth evening and the winner of the repechage round. The winner of the repechage round was "Blu" performed by Irene Fornaciari. The overall winner of the Big Artists section was determined over two rounds of voting. In the first round, the top three entries from the sixteen competing entries advance to the second round of voting. The three entries were "Nessun grado di separazione" performed by Francesca Michielin, "Un giorno mi dirai" performed by Stadio and "Via da qui" performed by Giovanni Caccamo and Deborah Iurato. In the second round, the winner was "Un giorno mi dirai" performed by Stadio.

Results for the two rounds of voting held for the final were determined through the combination of public televoting (40%), the votes of the expert jury (30%) and the votes of the demoscopic poll (30%).

In addition to the performances of the competing entries, guest performers included Renato Zero, Cristina D'Avena and Willy William. Other guests included ballet dancer Roberto Bolle and actors Guglielmo Scilla and Giuseppe Fiorello. The winner of the Newcomers'  section Francesco Gabbani also performed his song "Amen".Big Artists – Repechage

 Big Artists – Final – First RoundBig Artists – Final – Second Round

Awards and prizes
The winning artist(s) in both the Big Artists and Newcomers'  sections are awarded prizes for their victories. In addition, other awards are presented during the competition such as awards for the best lyrics and the best musical arrangement. These awards are decided upon by select groups of experts and journalists as well as members of the performing orchestra. The winning artist(s) in the Big Artists category also won the right to represent Italy at the Eurovision Song Contest 2016. As Stadio refused the offer to participate at the Eurovision Song Contest, the organisers of the event chose runner-up Francesca Michielin as the Eurovision entrant via their own criteria.Big ArtistsWinner of the Big Artists section for the 66th edition of the Sanremo Music Festival: Stadio – "Un giorno mi dirai"
Best Cover Version Award: Stadio – "La sera dei miracoli" (originally by Lucio Dalla)
Eurovision Song Contest 2016 entrant: Francesca MichielinGiancarlo Bigazzi Best Music Award: Stadio – "La sera dei miracoli"Mia Martini Critics Award: Patty Pravo – "Cieli immensi"Lucio Dalla Radio-TV-Web Award: Stadio – "Un giorno mi dirai"Newcomers' Winner of the Newcomers'  section for the 66th edition of the Sanremo Music Festival: Francesco Gabbani – "Amen"Emanuele Luzzati Newcomers' section Award: Francesco Gabbani – "Amen"Sergio Bardotti Best Lyrics Award: Francesco Gabbani – "Amen"
Assomusica Award for Best Live Performance: Chiara Dello Iacovo – "Introverso"Mia Martini Critics Award: Francesco Gabbani – "Amen"Lucio Dalla Radio-TV-Web Award: Chiara Dello Iacovo – "Introverso"

Broadcast and ratings

Local broadcast
Rai 1 and Rai Radio 2 carried the official broadcasts of the festival in Italy. Commentators for the Rai Radio 2 broadcast were Pif, Andrea Delogu and Michele Astori. The five evenings were also streamed online via the broadcaster's official website rai.it. In addition, the radio stations Radio Italia and RTL 102.5 also broadcast the event.

International broadcast
The international television service Rai Italia broadcast the competition in the Americas, Africa, Asia and Australia. In addition, the fifth evening was broadcast online via the official Eurovision Song Contest website eurovision.tv''. The following television channels and radio stations also broadcast the event:

   – CHIN-FM

See also
Italy in the Eurovision Song Contest 2016

Notes and references

Notes

References

External links
 Official website

Sanremo Music Festival by year
Eurovision Song Contest 2016
2016 in Italian music
2016 song contests
2016 in Italian television